The Lesser Windward skink (Marisora aurulae) is a species of skink found in St. Vincent and Tobago.

References

Marisora
Reptiles described in 2012
Taxa named by Stephen Blair Hedges
Taxa named by Caitlin E. Conn